Michael Gilday could refer to:

Michael M. Gilday, U.S. Chief of Naval Operations
Michael Gilday (speed skater) (born 1987), Canadian athlete